Colonel Blood  a is a 1934 British historical adventure film written and directed by W. P. Lipscomb and starring Frank Cellier, Anne Grey and Mary Lawson.

Plot
The plot is based on a dramatised account of the exploits of the historical renegade, Thomas Blood, in the Seventeenth Century and his attempted theft of the English Crown Jewels.

Production
The film was shot on location at Shepperton Studios near London. The film's sets were designed by the art directors John Bryan and Laurence Irving, while costumes were designed by Elizabeth Haffenden. It was shot on 35mm black and white film in an aspect ratio of 1.37:1. It was produced by Norman Loudon for Sound City Film, Shepperton Studio's in-house sound production company.

Cast
 Frank Cellier as Col. Blood 
 Anne Grey as Lady Castlemaine 
 Mary Lawson as Susie 
 Allan Jeayes as Charles II
 Hay Petrie as Mr. Edwards 
 Hilda Trevelyan as Mrs. Edwards 
 Arthur Chesney as Samuel Pepys 
 Stella Arbenina as Mrs. Pepys 
 Desmond Jeans as Parrot 
 Robert Nainby as Desborough 
 Arthur Goullet as Tim 
 Percy Standing as Duke of Ormonde 
 Ena Grossmith as Jane 
 Gabriel Toyne as Ossory 
 Peggy Evans as Nancy 
 E. Vivian Reynolds as Arlington 
 Tarva Penna as Chiffinch

References

Bibliography
 Klossner, Michael. The Europe of 1500-1815 on Film and Television: A Worldwide Filmography of Over 2550 Works, 1895 Through 2000. McFarland & Company, 2002.
 Low, Rachael. Filmmaking in 1930s Britain. George Allen & Unwin, 1985.
 Scott, Ian. From Pinewood to Hollywood: British Filmmakers in American Cinema, 1910-1969. Palgrave MacMillan, 2010.
 Wood, Linda. British Films, 1927-1939. British Film Institute, 1986.

External links
 
 

1934 films
1930s heist films
1930s historical drama films
British historical drama films
British heist films
Films set in the 1670s
Metro-Goldwyn-Mayer films
British black-and-white films
1934 drama films
Cultural depictions of Charles II of England
Films shot at Shepperton Studios
Cultural depictions of Barbara Palmer, 1st Duchess of Cleveland
1930s English-language films
1930s British films
Films set in London